Chicoreus rossiteri is a species of sea snail, a marine gastropod mollusk in the family Muricidae, the murex snails or rock snails.

Description
The length of the shell attains 46.6 mm.

Distribution
This marine species occurs off New Caledonia.

References

 Crosse, H., 1872. Diagnoses Molluscorum Novae Caledoniae incolarum. Journal de Conchyliologie 20: 70-75
 Houart, R., 1992. The genus Chicoreus and related genera (Gastropoda: Muricidae) in the Indo-West Pacific. Mémoires du Muséum national d'Histoire naturelle 154(A): 1-188

External links
 MNHN, Paris: neotype

Gastropods described in 1872
Chicoreus